H27 may refer to:

 , a Royal Navy E-class destroyer
 , a British H-class submarine
 Lioré et Olivier LeO H-27, a French flying boat